In tennis, the Grand Slam tournaments, the Masters Series tournaments and the Year-end Championship are considered the top-tier events of the men's professional tour annual calendar, in addition to the Olympics. They are collectively known as the 'Big Titles'. The ATP defined the mandatory events (Slams, Masters and YEC) as follows

This article lists the respective singles champions of those events since the inception of the ATP Tour in 1990.

Note: By setting 1990 as the cut-off point, this list excludes many notable champions in top level tournaments from previous years. The Grand Slam tournaments and the Year-end Championship have been held since 1877 and 1970 respectively. The Olympics was first played in 1896 until 1924. High category tournaments equivalent to the Masters Series like the Grand Prix Super Series existed before the ATP Tour was introduced. There were also the professional Majors, the World Championship Series and the amateur Majors (WHCC, WCCC) before the Open Era.

Champions list

Big Titles leaders 
 Active players and records in bold.

Big Titles Sweep (annual) 
Winning all of the annual Big Titles over the course of a player's career: all four Grand Slam titles, all active Masters Series titles and the Year-end Championship.
 The event at which the sweep was completed indicated in bold.

Calendar sweeps 
 Back-to-back titles in a calendar year.

Statistics

 

Other active players

See also 
List of ATP Tour top-level tournament doubles champions
List of Grand Slam men's singles champions
Tennis Masters Series records and statistics
List of Olympic medalists in tennis
List of WTA Tour top-level tournament singles champions
List of WTA Tour top-level tournament doubles champions

Notes

References

External links 
 ATP World Tour - Results Archive.
 Ultimate Tennis Statistics

ATP Tour
ATP
ATP
+
ATP Tour